Theclopsis  epidius  is a Neotropical butterfly in the family Lycaenidae. It is found in Panama and Colombia.

References

Theclinae
Taxa named by Frederick DuCane Godman
Taxa named by Osbert Salvin